Jakub Stolarczyk (born 19 December 2000) is a Polish professional footballer who plays as a goalkeeper for Hartlepool United on loan from Premier League club Leicester City.

Career

Stolarczyk started his career with Polish seventh tier side Piast Chęciny. In 2017, he joined the youth academy of Leicester City in the English Premier League.

Before the second half of the 2021–22 season, Stolarczyk was sent on loan to Scottish second tier club Dunfermline Athletic. In August 2022, he was sent on loan to EFL League One club Fleetwood Town. On 13 January 2023, he was recalled from his loan, joining League Two club Hartlepool United ten days later on loan until the end of the season. Stolarczyk made his Hartlepool debut, replacing Ben Killip and managed to keep a clean sheet in a 1–0 win over Doncaster Rovers.

References

External links

 

2000 births
Living people
People from Kielce
Association football goalkeepers
Polish footballers
Poland youth international footballers
Poland under-21 international footballers
Leicester City F.C. players
Dunfermline Athletic F.C. players
Fleetwood Town F.C. players
Hartlepool United F.C. players
Scottish Professional Football League players
Polish expatriate footballers
Expatriate footballers in England
Expatriate footballers in Scotland
Polish expatriate sportspeople in England
Polish expatriate sportspeople in Scotland